Jaqueline Maria Pereira de Carvalho Endres (born December 31, 1983 in Recife, Brazil) is a Brazilian volleyball player, a member of the Brazilian team that won the Olympic Games at Beijing 2008 and London 2012.

Career

Club
She started her career with Gremio de Volei Osasco in 2002, before moving to Unilever Rio de Janeiro in 2004. In 2006 she moved to play in Europe for Vini Monteschiavo Jesi, later joining Gruppo Murcia 2002 and Scavolini Pesaro.

She joined Camponesa-Minas for the 2014/15 season, before moving to play for Sesi-SP. She returned to Minas in November 2016.

International

She was part of the national team that won the gold medal at the 2011 Pan American Games held in Guadalajara, Mexico. Carvalho and Brazil's national team won the gold medal at the 2012 Summer Olympics in London. On August 24, 2013, she won a fourth gold medal of the World Grand Prix after winning the final match against Japan.

Carvalho won the silver medal at the 2015 Pan American Games when her national team was defeated in the championship match by the United States, 0-3.

Personal life
She is married to fellow Brazilian volleyball player Murilo Endres, with whom she has a son named Arthur.

Clubs

  Vôlei Osasco (2002–2004)
  Rexona-Ades (2004–2006)
  Vini Monteschiavo Jesi (2006–2007)
  Gruppo Murcia (2007–2008)
  Scavolini Pesaro (2008–2009)
  Sollys Osasco (2009–2014)
  Minas Tênis Clube (2014–2015)
  SESI-SP (2015–2016)
  Minas Tênis Clube (2016–2017)
  Hinode Barueri (2017–2018)
  Osasco Audax (2019–2021)

Awards

Individuals
 2001 FIVB U20 World Championship – "Most Valuable Player"
 2006 FIVB World Championship – "Best Receiver"
 2009 South America Club Championship – "Most Valuable Player"
 2009–10 Brazilian Superliga – "Most Valuable Player" 
 2010 FIVB World Grand Prix – "Best Spiker"
 2011 South America Club Championship – "Most Valuable Player"
 2012 South America Club Championship – "Best Server"
 2012 FIVB Club World Championship – "Best Receiver"
 2012–13 Brazilian Superliga – "Best Receiver"

Clubs
 2002–03 Brazilian Superliga –  Champion, with Osasco Vôlei
 2003–04 Brazilian Superliga –  Champion, with Osasco Vôlei
 2005–06 Brazilian Superliga –  Champion, with Rexona Ades
 2008–09 Italian League –  Champion, with Scavolini Pesaro
 2009–10 Brazilian Superliga –  Champion, with Sollys Osasco
 2011–12 Brazilian Superliga –  Champion, with Sollys Osasco
 2009 South American Club Championship –  Champion, with Sollys Osasco
 2010 South American Club Championship –  Champion, with Sollys Osasco
 2011 South American Club Championship –  Champion, with Sollys Osasco
 2012 South American Club Championship –  Champion, with Sollys Nestlé Osasco
 2012 Club World Championship –  Champion, with Sollys Nestlé Osasco

References

External links
 Jaqueline Carvalho at the International Volleyball Federation
 
 
 
 

1983 births
Living people
Brazilian women's volleyball players
Brazilian expatriate sportspeople in Spain
Brazilian expatriates in Italy
Volleyball players at the 2008 Summer Olympics
Volleyball players at the 2011 Pan American Games
Olympic volleyball players of Brazil
Olympic gold medalists for Brazil
Sportspeople from Recife
Olympic medalists in volleyball
Volleyball players at the 2012 Summer Olympics
Volleyball players at the 2016 Summer Olympics
Medalists at the 2012 Summer Olympics
Medalists at the 2008 Summer Olympics
Volleyball players at the 2015 Pan American Games
Pan American Games medalists in volleyball
Pan American Games gold medalists for Brazil
Pan American Games silver medalists for Brazil
Liberos
Opposite hitters
Outside hitters
Medalists at the 2011 Pan American Games
Medalists at the 2015 Pan American Games